The Tourist Police Bureau of Thailand was formed on September 1, 2017. It was elevated from the Tourist Police Division, which was formed in 1992 and traces its origins to 1976. The Tourist Police is a department of the  Royal Thai Police, which is the main law enforcement agency in the country. The creation of the Tourist Police is due to the fact that the tourism and entertainment industry in Thailand is growing every year, and the number of people arriving in the country is constantly increasing. The priorities of the Tourist Police include cooperation with foreign nationals and the promotion of their security.

On September 2021, General Prawit Wongsuwan who is the Deputy Prime Minister. appointed Lieutenant-General Sukhun Phrommai Commander of the Tourist Police.

Functions
The Office of the Tourist Police has the following powers and responsibilities:

 Planning development strategies, monitoring, providing advice to other police departments.
 To ensure the safety of the king, regent, privileged persons and members of the royal family. 
 Increase the confidence of tourists in their safety. As well as the safety of their property.
 Assist tourists.
 Eliminate fraud, protecting the interests of tourists.
 If necessary, help tourists cooperate with other police departments.
 To contribute to the improvement of the country's tourist image.

According to Reuters correspondent, Andrew Marshall, "The country has a special force of Tourist Police, set up specifically so that foreigners have as little contact as possible with the ordinary police—the effect on the crucial tourism industry would be chilling."

According to one source, there are 1,700 enlisted tourist police on the force, and has its own S.W.A.T.

See also
 Royal Thai Police
 Border Patrol Police

References

External links
 Royal Decree establishing the Tourist Police

Law enforcement in Thailand
Tourism in Thailand
Sub-departmental government bodies of Thailand
Royal Thai Police